The men's 4 × 400 metres relay competition at the 1998 Asian Games in Bangkok, Thailand was held on 18 and 19 December at the Thammasat Stadium.

Schedule
All times are Indochina Time (UTC+07:00)

Results

Heats
 Qualification: First 3 in each heat (Q) and the next 2 fastest (q) advance to the final.

Heat 1

Heat 2 
 Wind: +0.6 m/s

Final

References 

Athletics at the 1998 Asian Games
1998